North Quay is a location in the Brisbane central business district and the name of a street in the same area, running along the Brisbane River from an intersection near Makerston Street to the top of the Queen Street mall, linking the Victoria Bridge and the William Jolly Bridge along the river’s northern bank. It was the site of Brisbane’s initial settlement, at a point where a stream flowing from Spring Hill provided fresh water, later collected in a reservoir on Tank Street.

Location
The precise bounds of this small locality are open to debate. On one view, it is about seven blocks long, covering the northerly bank of the Brisbane River between the Victoria Bridge and the William Jolly Bridge; another view gives it roughly the area of four city blocks in length, from Ann Street north of Brisbane Square to Queens Gardens, including the Conrad Treasury Casino. On either view it is little more than a single block in width, extending North only to George Street and Roma Street.

The location has an historical record in Queensland because it was a landing point during the first European exploration of the river in 1823 and later in 1825, the Moreton Bay penal colony at Redcliffe relocated here, establishing the first permanent European settlement in what was to become the state of Queensland.

Captain Henry Miller was responsible for the settlement transfer, which was due to unfriendly aborigines, biting insects and a lack of reliable fresh water at Redcliffe. Although North Quay is most likely not the exact location selected by John Oxley and Sir Thomas Brisbane during scouting expeditions in November 1824, the high banks at North Quay proved to be highly suitable, well above the flood levels that plagued Brisbane in subsequent years.

A riverside bikeway leading to the University of Queensland and the western suburbs from the Victoria Bridge has been built on the river at North Quay.

Legal Precinct

North Quay was historically and remains the centre of Queensland’s legal infrastructure:

 From 1879 to 2012, the Supreme Court of Queensland was located in the block bounded by North Quay, Ann Street, George Street and Adelaide Street.
 Diagonally opposite, State Government legal offices, including the Department of Justice and Attorney General, the Crown Law Office and the office of the Director of Public Prosecutions, are located in the State Law Building at the intersection of Ann Street and George Street.
 The Brisbane home of the Federal judiciary is located in the Harry Gibbs Commonwealth Law Courts Building, which fronts North Quay between Turbot Street and Tank Street.
The Inns of Court - the purpose-built home of the Queensland Bar - also fronts North Quay, situated on the opposite side of Turbot Street.
 The headquarters of the Queensland Police Service is located at the intersection of Roma Street and Makerston Street.
 Since 2004, the Brisbane Magistrates Court building has occupied a triangular block bounded by George, Roma, and Turbot Streets, to which was added in 2012 the Queen Elizabeth II Courts of Law to house the relocated Supreme and District Courts of Queensland.

Street
The road can be congested on week days with traffic from Coronation Drive using part of the street to enter the city. The road also feeds traffic on to the Riverside Expressway, one end of the Pacific Motorway.

Towards the easterly end, North Quay leads into William Street and the government precinct further east along the river. Since 2021, works associated with construction of the Adelaide Street tunnel connexion to the King George Square busway station have created chaotic traffic conditions, especially during peak commuting times, along North Quay between Ann street and the Victoria Bridge, also affecting the southern end of Adelaide Street from its intersection with George Street. The lack of alternative routes, combined with poor site planning, results in gridlock conditions on a daily basis.

Heritage listings

North Quay has a number of heritage-listed sites, including:
 Sections of Albert St, George St, William St, North Quay, Queen's Wharf Rd: Early Streets of Brisbane
 Coronation Drive: Coronation Drive retaining wall
 273 North Quay: First Church of Christ, Scientist
 William Street: William Street retaining wall

Major intersections

 Queen Street
 Adelaide Street
 Ann Street
 Riverside Expressway
 Turbot Street
 Tank Street
 Herschel Street
 Makerston Street
 Saul Street / William Jolly Bridge

See also

 Northbank (Brisbane)
 North Quay 1 & 2 Ferry Wharf

References

External links

 
Streets in Brisbane
Brisbane central business district
Pre-Separation Queensland